The minute clingfish (Liobranchia stria) is a tiny species of clingfish native to reef environments around the island of Guam, the Marshall Islands and the Northern Marianas Islands.  This species is the only known member of its genus. This species was described in 1955 by John C. Briggs from a type collected off Saipan.

References

Gobiesocidae
Monotypic fish genera
Fish described in 1955